Thomas John Otzelberger (born September 17, 1977) is an American college basketball coach who is currently the head coach at Iowa State University.

Early and personal life
Otzelberger was born in Milwaukee, Wisconsin, the son of Thomas L. and Jackie A. Otzelberger. He attended Thomas More High School in Milwaukee, Wisconsin, where he was a three-year starter on the varsity basketball team. He played college basketball at the University of Wisconsin-Whitewater, and was team captain for two years. On June 1, 2013, he married Alison Lacey, former ISU women's basketball standout, former WNBA player,  and former coach of the Marshalltown Community College women's basketball team.

Coaching career

Early coaching career
From 2001 to 2004 Otzelberger served as a basketball coach at Burlington Catholic Central High School in Burlington, Wisconsin. He was promoted to varsity head coach and athletic director in 2003. For the 2004-2005 season, he moved to Marianna, Florida to join the Chipola College staff as an assistant coach. In that season, the Indians finished 33-4, won the Panhandle Conference and placed third at the 2005 NJCAA national tournament in Hutchinson, Kansas.

Iowa State (assistant) 
Otzelberger served on the Cyclones' coaching staff for eight seasons. He initially joined the Iowa State coaching staff under former Iowa State head coach Greg McDermott in 2006, and served under him as an assistant through the 2009-2010 season. When McDermott was succeeded by Fred Hoiberg in May 2010, Otzelberger was promoted to the position of associate head coach.

In 2011-2012, Hoiberg led Iowa State to a 23-11 overall record and a third-place finish in the Big 12 Conference, advancing to the NCAA tournament for the first time since 2005. The Cyclones defeated reigning national champion Connecticut in third round tourney action, before falling to eventual national champion Kentucky. In 2012-2013, the Cyclones finished 4th in the Big 12 Conference while advancing to the third round of the NCAA Tournament before losing to Ohio State on a buzzer beater. During this stretch, the Cyclones were among the nation's leading teams in scoring, returning the team to national prominence.

Otzelberger has been widely regarded as one of the top recruiters in the nation. His efforts have helped secure the services of Cyclone greats Mike Taylor, Craig Brackins, Diante Garrett, Scott Christopherson, Chris Babb, Chris Allen, Will Clyburn, Korie Lucious, Melvin Ejim, Georges Niang, Naz Long, and Matt Thomas, among others. In addition to recruiting, Otzelberger was in charge of opponent scouting and game planning for the Cyclones tournament run in 2012 and 2013.

In April 2015, Otzelberger returned as an assistant coach for Iowa State after leaving Washington.

Washington
On May 7, 2013, Washington Huskies head coach Lorenzo Romar announced that Otzelberger had joined his staff as an assistant coach. NBC Sports called Coach Otzelberger's hiring at Washington as one of the top 10 key assistant coaching hires for the 2013-14 season. Following the 2014 season, Jay Bilas and Jeff Goodman ranked TJ as one of the top college head coaching candidates. On April 1, 2015 it was announced that Otzelberger was returning to Iowa State to replace Matt Abdelmassih.

South Dakota State
On April 14, 2016, Otzelberger was named head coach of South Dakota State, replacing Scott Nagy, who left after 21 years to become the head coach at Wright State. In his first season as head coach, Otzelberger led the Jackrabbits to the Summit League tournament championship and an automatic berth into the NCAA tournament, losing in the first round to eventual tournament runner-up Gonzaga.  On March 6, 2018, Otzelberger led the Jackrabbits back to the NCAA Tournament, their third straight trip to the Big Dance, with a 97-87 win over the University of South Dakota.

UNLV 
On March 27, 2019, the UNLV Runnin' Rebels announced Otzelberger would become its 13th head coach.

On February 22, 2020, Otzelberger and the Runnin' Rebels defeated #4 San Diego State University, handing SDSU their first loss of the season.

Iowa State (head coach)
On March 18, 2021 Otzelberger was hired at Iowa State, replacing Steve Prohm who was fired after winning just two games in a COVID shortened season.
Otzelberger won his 100th career game on November 9th, 2021 in an 84-73 victory over Kansas State.  Otzelberger accomplished the nation's largest turnaround in his first year at the helm at Iowa State, winning 22 games and making the Sweet Sixteen of the NCAA tournament.

Community service
Otzelberger is openly passionate about teaching young people and was actively involved in the National Association of Basketball Coaches "Stay in to Win" program. This program was set up to help students focus on making important decisions in order to become more successful in school and impact their overall quality of life. Otzelberger is also highly involved with the Boys and Girls Clubs of America. He is also a member of the Villa 7 Consortium, which aims to develop the nation's top assistant coaches.

Head coaching record

College

References

External links
 
 South Dakota State profile

1977 births
Living people
American men's basketball coaches
American men's basketball players
Basketball coaches from Wisconsin
Basketball players from Milwaukee
College men's basketball head coaches in the United States
Iowa State Cyclones men's basketball coaches
High school basketball coaches in Wisconsin
Junior college men's basketball coaches in the United States
Point guards
South Dakota State Jackrabbits men's basketball coaches
Sportspeople from Milwaukee
UNLV Runnin' Rebels basketball coaches
Washington Huskies men's basketball coaches
Wisconsin–Whitewater Warhawks men's basketball players